Gold Rush is a song by American indie pop band Death Cab for Cutie, released as the lead single for their ninth studio album, Thank You for Today, on June 13, 2018.

Origins and lyrics

"Gold Rush" originated as a demo that the band planned to discard, but was revisited at the suggestion of producer Rich Costey and combined with another demo. The song was written by lead vocalist and guitarist Ben Gibbard as "a requiem for a skyline", inspired by the rapid changes to Seattle's Capitol Hill neighborhood, where Gibbard had lived for 20 years and some areas were "almost unrecognizable" due to the influx of workers for companies like Amazon.

Composition

The song makes use of a sample from "Mind Train", a song from Yoko Ono's 1971 album Fly. The song is in the key of F major and has a BPM of 80. The title is mentioned 46 times throughout the song.

Music video

The music video for "Gold Rush", directed by Alex Southam, features Gibbard walking down a city street, observing passersby as their outfits change to a modern style. The video ends with Gibbard stopped by a swarm of people distracted by their smartphones.

Media appearances

Death Cab for Cutie performed the song on the June 21, 2018, episode of The Late Show with Stephen Colbert.
It appears on the EA Sports FIFA 19 video game.

Charts

Weekly charts

Year-end charts

References

2018 songs
2018 singles
Death Cab for Cutie songs
Atlantic Records singles
Songs written by Ben Gibbard
Songs written by Yoko Ono